Monte is a milk cream dessert brand, made by the dairy company Zott. It is a dessert made of milk, chocolate and hazelnuts. Zott Monte advertises with the slogan full taste, full power, full fun!. Monte is worldwide one of the most famous brands of Zott and it is delivered in over 40 countries. Monte product range varies within the different countries.

Product range

History 
Monte was introduced April 1, 1996 in Italy. Within the following years (1997–2001) Zott established Monte in these countries: Czech Republic, Austria, Russia, Belgium, Slovenia, Slovakia, Bosnia and Herzegovina, Croatia, Poland, Estonia, Latvia, Lithuania, Malta, Macedonia, Kosovo and Serbia. Meanwhile, Monte is available in over 40 Countries. It is also available in the European Union countries depending on the custom flavours as well in the United States, Canada and Australia.

Chronicle 
 2007 Monte launched a promo with on-pack tattoos for Shrek 3 film.
 2008 Introduction of new Monte SKUs 6x55g and 4x100g.
 2012 Monte introduced "weniger süß" ("less sweet") in Germany. 
 2013 Introduction of new Two-Chamber SKUs. Additional cereals, cherry etc. in an extra chamber are now possible.
 2014 Extension of Monte product range with Monte plus. Zott added different sauces (caramel, chocolate or cappuccino) to the classic Monte. Furthermore, Zott introduced in this year the Monte Snack. The snack is made of milk cream, chocolate/hazelnut cream which are sandwiched between two slices of cake.
 2015 Extension of Monte 2-chamber range with new flavors (Choco-Flakes, Choco-Balls, Cacao-Cookies and Waffle-Sticks).

Awards 
 2014: Monte is awarded with Top Brand from Lebensmittel Zeitung.

Advertising 
In 2010 the company recruited the German goalkeeper René Adler and his brother Rico for several commercials of the brand "Monte". In 2013 Zott changed the brand ambassadors for "Monte". Since then windsurf world champion Philip Köster and his sister Kyra advertise for "Monte". In 2013 Monte Cherry and Monte Crunchy were introduced in Poland by the Polish Volleyball Star Bartosz Kurek. That was the second time Bartosz advertise for Zott Monte.
Csaba Vastag is a Hungarian musician and since 2013 the brand ambassador for Zott Monte in Hungary.

References

External links 
 Zott
 Monte

German brands
Desserts